Seven Seas is a compilation album of Echo & the Bunnymen songs. It was released on 12 September 2005 in the United Kingdom and on 13 September 2005 in the United States where it is called Seven Seas: The Platinum Collection.

Track listing
"The Back of Love" – 3:11
"Seven Seas" – 3:17
"All That Jazz" – 2:47
"Do it Clean" – 2:50
"Villiers Terrace" – 6:00
"Over the Wall" – 5:59
"A Promise" – 4:08
"The Disease" – 2:28
"Never Stop" – 3:31
"The Game" – 3:50
"Lips Like Sugar" – 4:52
"Bedbugs and Ballyhoo" – 3:28
"Bring On the Dancing Horses" – 3:58
"Silver" – 3:18
"The Cutter" – 3:53

References

Echo & the Bunnymen compilation albums
2005 compilation albums